William Boyde (born 15 December 1994) is a Welsh rugby union player who plays for the Cardiff Blues at flanker, he can also play Number 8. He was a Wales under-20 international.

Boyde made his debut for the Scarlets in 2014, whilst also playing for feeder club Carmarthen Quins. Boyde was released from the Scarlets at the end of the 2018-2019 Pro14 season. He was signed by the Cardiff Blues following season, making his competitive debut in a 27-31 win against the Southern Kings.

References

External links 
Scarlets Player Profile
ESPN Player Profile

1994 births
Living people
Scarlets players
Rugby union players from Narberth
Welsh rugby union players
Cardiff Rugby players
Rugby union flankers
Rugby union number eights